The 2007 All England Open Super Series (officially known as the Yonex All England Open 2007 for sponsorship reasons) was a badminton tournament which took place at National Indoor Stadium in Birmingham, England, from 6 to 11 March 2007 and had a total purse of $200,000.

Tournament 
The 2007 All England Open Super Series was the third tournament of the 2007 BWF Super Series and also part of the All England Open championships, which had been held since 1899.

Venue 
This international tournament was held at National Indoor Arena in Birmingham, England.

Point distribution 
Below is the point distribution for each phase of the tournament based on the BWF points system for the BWF Super Series event.

Prize money 
The total prize money for this tournament was US$200,000. Distribution of prize money was in accordance with BWF regulations.

Men's singles

Seeds 
 Lin Dan (champion)
 Chen Jin (semi-finals)
 Peter Gade (first round)
 Lee Chong Wei (quarter-finals)
 Bao Chunlai (semi-finals)
 Chen Yu (final)
 Muhammad Hafiz Hashim (second round)
 Kenneth Jonassen (quarter-finals)

Finals

Top half

Section 1

Section 2

Bottom half

Section 3

Section 4

Women's singles

Seeds 
 Xie Xingfang (champion)
 Zhang Ning (semi-finals)
 Wang Chen (quarter-finals)
 Huaiwen Xu (quarter-finals)
 Lu Lan (first round)
 Pi Hongyan (final)
 Yao Jie (first round)
 Zhu Lin (semi-finals)

Finals

Top half

Section 1

Section 2

Bottom half

Section 3

Section 4

Men's doubles

Seeds 
 Fu Haifeng / Cai Yun (final)
 Jens Eriksen / Martin Lundgaard Hansen (semi-finals)
 Jung Jae-sung / Lee Yong-dae (quarter-finals)
 Markis Kido / Hendra Setiawan (second round)
 Choong Tan Fook / Lee Wan Wah (quarter-finals)
 Koo Kien Keat / Tan Boon Heong (champions)
 Lee Jae-jin / Hwang Ji-man (second round)
 Candra Wijaya /  Tony Gunawan (semi-finals)

Finals

Top half

Section 1

Section 2

Bottom half

Section 3

Section 4

Women's doubles

Seeds 
 Gao Ling / Huang Sui (semi-finals)
 Yang Wei / Zhang Jiewen (final)
 Chien Yu-chin / Cheng Wen-hsing (quarter-finals)
 Zhang Yawen / Wei Yili (champions)
 Du Jing / Yu Yang (quarter-finals)
 Gail Emms / Donna Kellogg (second round)
 Jiang Yanmei / Li Yujia (first round)
 Wong Pei Tty / Chin Eei Hui (semi-finals)

Finals

Top half

Section 1

Section 2

Bottom half

Section 3

Section 4

Mixed doubles

Seeds 
 Nova Widianto / Lilyana Natsir (quarter-finals)
 Xie Zhongbo / Zhang Yawen (semi-finals)
 Nathan Robertson / Gail Emms (quarter-finals)
 Thomas Laybourn / Kamilla Rytter Juhl (second round)
 Anthony Clark / Donna Kellogg (final)
 Robert Mateusiak / Nadieżda Kostiuczyk (first round)
 Hendri Saputra / Li Yujia (first round)
 Flandy Limpele / Vita Marissa (second round)

Finals

Top half

Section 1

Section 2

Bottom half

Section 3

Section 4

References

External links 
Official website
Tournament Link

All England Open Badminton Championships
All England Open
All England
Sports competitions in Birmingham, West Midlands
March 2007 sports events in the United Kingdom